Ferlyn G (Chinese: 黄晶玲; born February 1, 1992), is a Singaporean singer, dancer and actress. She was a member of South Korean girl group, Skarf from 2012 to 2014. She is currently based in Singapore.

Born and raised in Singapore, Ferlyn is fluent in both English and Mandarin and also Korean after spending two years in South Korea preparing for her debut in Skarf. She released her debut EP, First on January 2, 2015. In 2015, Ferlyn announced that she would be leaving iGlobal Star to set up her own label, GIF Music. She made her feature film debut in When Ghost Meets Zombie (2019).

Early life
Born on February 1, 1992, Ferlyn is the younger sibling in her family. Before auditioning for Alpha Entertainment, she was a trainee at Ocean Butterflies International, where she did backup dancing for JJ Lin, Rainie Yang and Wang Lee Hom. Ferlyn was also a business student at Temasek Polytechnic and had quit her studies at the institution after being accepted during the audition. She moved to South Korea to prepare for her debut in a girl group.

Career

2012–2013: Debut with Skarf, cameo in It Takes Two and Luv Virus

After passing the audition by JYP & Alpha Entertainment, she debuted in Skarf, a four-member girl group with another Singaporean member, Tasha and two other Korean members.

On August 13, 2012, Skarf debuted with Oh! Dance and performed the song on KBS's Music Bank on August 17, 2012. Ferlyn had also made a cameo appearance in Singaporean TV series, It Takes Two with other Skarf members.

Skarf made their comeback with "Luv Virus" on May 28, 2013 and on May 31, 2013, the music video for Luv Virus was uploaded on their official YouTube channel.

2014–2015: Departure from Skarf, First and Gif To You
On September 16, 2014, it was announced that Ferlyn will be leaving SKarf and will release a solo mandarin EP by 2015.

On January 2, 2015, Ferlyn released her debut EP, First after a series of teasers. The EP consists of two Mandarin tracks and one Korean track. The Korean track, titled Luv Talk features Mint from Tiny-G. She held a press conference on the day of release in the Atrium at Bugis+, in Singapore and will be promoting her album in Korea, China, Hong Kong, Taiwan, Thailand and Malaysia.

Ferlyn left Alpha Entertainment in 2015 and co-founded an independent record label and artist management company, GIF Music. On November 17, 2015, she released a self-composed hip-hop single in English, Gif To You, which was released digitally on November 17, 2015.

2019–present: First lead role
In 2018, it was announced that Wong was cast in a horror-comedy film, titled When Ghost Meets Zombie, playing in her first lead role. She was paired up with fellow singer, Nathan Hartono. The film was released on 14 February 2019, and the official theme song, "等" was released on 25 January 2019 on Warner Music Singapore's YouTube channel. Her second single for the film, "匆匆" was released on AC Music Entertainment's YouTube Channel.

Discography

Extended Play 
 First (2015)

Singles

Soundtrack appearance

Filmography

Films

Television series

Television show

Awards and nominations

References

External links
 
Official Facebook

1992 births
Living people
21st-century Singaporean women singers
Korean-language singers of Singapore
Singaporean expatriates in South Korea
Chinese K-pop singers
Singaporean people of Chinese descent
Singaporean Mandopop singers